Maxime Dupé (born 4 March 1993) is a French professional footballer who plays as a goalkeeper for  club Toulouse.

Club career
Dupé joined the youth system of Nantes in 2008 and signed his first professional contract with the club in the summer of 2012. He made his Ligue 1 debut on 15 February 2014, keeping a clean sheet in a 0–0 draw against Nice.

In 2022, Dupé won the Ligue 2 title with Toulouse.

International career 
Dupé has represented France at both under-17 and under-18 levels. He was an unused member of the under-20 squad that won the 2013 FIFA U-20 World Cup.

Honours 
Toulouse

 Ligue 2: 2021–22

France U20

 FIFA U-20 World Cup: 2013

References

External links
 
 
 
 
 

1993 births
Living people
People from Malestroit
Sportspeople from Morbihan
Association football goalkeepers
FC Nantes players
Clermont Foot players
Toulouse FC players
Ligue 1 players
Ligue 2 players
France youth international footballers
French footballers
Footballers from Brittany